Rebellion in Pkhovi and Didoya was an 1212 uprising of the mountainous communities in Kingdom of Georgia, against the attempts of transplanting feudal practices and forceful Christianization of the locals. In the last years of Queen Tamar's reign an uprising began in the mountain areas of Pkhovi, Mtiuleti, and Didoeti.

History 
Although mountainous communities were nominally under the direct rule of the Georgian crown, they had never been completely integrated into the feudal system of medieval Georgia, and remained relatively little affected by implantation of aristocratic landowners. local patriarchal communities were rather electing their own council of elders and leaders, known as Khevisberi who functioned as a judge, priest and military leader.

During the reign of Queen Tamar, Georgian feudal lords gradually increased their rights. This was a classical period in the history of Georgian feudalism. Georgia's northeastern frontier became the object of the Kakhetian Eristavis avarice. Attempts at transplanting feudal practices in the areas where they had previously been almost unknown did not pass without resistance. Thus, there was a revolt among the mountaineers of Pkhovi and Didoya in 1212. The refractory independence of Mountainous clans led to the sporadic incursions of royal troops aided by the ruler of the Durdzuks Khasi I, bent on forcing them into submission. One of the most devastating expeditions against the Mountaineers was organized in  1212, at the behest of the queen Tamar of Georgia who presided over the Golden Age of the Kingdom of Georgia. The contemporary chronicle recounts a bloody three-month campaign of pacification by Tamar's general  Ivane Mkhargrdzeli, that left several villages and shrines destroyed.

References

Sources 
 R. Metreveli, Georgian Soviet Encyclopedia, X, p. 439, Tbilisi, 1986

Conflicts in 1212
13th century in the Kingdom of Georgia
13th-century rebellions
Uprisings of Georgia (country)
Kingdom of Georgia
Wars involving Ingushetia
Wars involving Chechnya